Norman Oswald (31 October 1916 – 22 June 1970) was an Australian cricketer. He played in twelve first-class matches for South Australia between 1936 and 1950.

See also
 List of South Australian representative cricketers

References

External links
 

1916 births
1970 deaths
Australian cricketers
South Australia cricketers
Cricketers from Adelaide